Z-class may refer to:

 SR Z Class, a class of steam locomotive built by the Southern Railway in the United Kingdom
 WAGR Z class, a class of diesel-mechanical locomotives of the Western Australian Government Railways
 W and Z-class destroyer, a class of destroyers of the Royal Navy launched in 1943–1944
Z-Class Melbourne Tram, a single bogie electric tram used in Australia